Gudumba Shankar is a 2004 Indian Telugu-language action comedy film directed by Veera Shankar and produced by Nagendra Babu under Anjana Productions banner. Pawan Kalyan plays the title role in addition to writing the screenplay. The film also stars Meera Jasmine and Ashish Vidyarthi while Sayaji Shinde, Brahmanandam and Ali play supporting roles. The music was scored by Mani Sharma with cinematography by Chota K. Naidu. The film was an average grosser at the box office.

Plot
Gudumba Shankar (Pawan Kalyan) is a small-time thief who makes a living by arresting people. On his way to Mumbai, he accidentally meets Gowri (Meera Jasmine). Both of them are forced to travel together. A few more incidents make them good friends. Shankar realizes that Gowri is a girl who ran away from her house. By then, they start having feelings for each other. A rowdy named Kumaraswamy (Ashish Vidyarthi) wants to marry Gowri forcibly,as her astrology is auspicious for him, which is why she runs away from her home. Soon, Kumarasamy takes Gowri back to the house.

Kumaraswamy is extremely superstitious and heavily depends on the astrology of Parabrahma Swamy (Brahmanandam). Shankar blackmails Parabrahma (to disclose his illicit affair) and joins the wedding house as the wedding planner along with Ali and two other buddies. Shankar later tricks Kumaraswamy into thinking that Gowri is inauspicious for him and that if he marries her he would be destroyed. He plans elaborate tricks by burning or hurting someone wherever Gowri is involved. After Kumaraswamy leaves Shankar marries Gowri, but Kumaraswamy comes and beats up Shankar and kidnaps Gowri but Shankar miraculously wakes up and beats up everyone and takes Gowri back.

Cast

Music 
The film has six songs composed by Mani Sharma:

Reception
Sify rated the film 3/5 and called it "disappointing." The reviewer wrote that "You desperately want to like the film for the maddeningly zany characters played out by Pawan, Meera, Ali, Brahmanandam and others. Alas but nobody can improve on this script full of scenes, inspired from half a dozen Hollywood and Bollywood films of yesteryears!" Griddaluru Goplarao of Zamin Ryot also criticized the weak storyline and screenplay.

References

External links
 

2004 films
2000s Telugu-language films
Films scored by Mani Sharma
Indian action comedy films
2004 action comedy films
Films about astrology